Kurt Carr (born October 12, 1964) is an American gospel music composer and performer. While living in the city of Hartford, Connecticut, he served as Minister of Music at The First Baptist Church of Hartford located at the time on Greenfield Street. He is currently the Praise and Worship leader at The Fountain Of Praise in Houston, TX.

Biography

Early years
Kurt Carr was born in the mid-1960s in Hartford, Connecticut, where he grew up in a family who believed in Jesus, but was not deeply involved in church. At the age of 13, K
Carr found himself being increasingly drawn to the church. In his early teen years, he performed as an actor and dancer at the Hartford Stage Company in a Broadway musical called On the Town, which was directed by Clay Stevenson. He became an active member in his church's music department. At the age of 17, Carr realized that he was being called to do something even higher with his life. After high school, he entered into the music program at the University of Connecticut, where he studied classical music and earned a Fine Arts degree. Carr is a member of Phi Beta Sigma fraternity.

Music career

Early career
Carr was piano accompanist for Andrae Crouch's music ministry for one year. Carr was subsequently hired to be musical director and pianist for Rev. James Cleveland’s ministry in 1986  and was employed there for seven years, until Cleveland's death. Eventually, Carr became director of the West Angeles Church of God in Christ Choir, where he had the opportunity to work with both gospel and secular musical artists, including Stevie Wonder, Gladys Knight, Yolanda Adams and Kirk Franklin during that time Carr  also formed a gospel vocal ensemble named The Kurt Carr Singers. They released their first EP, I'm Glad in 1988 released on an Independent label. After signing with Light Records, Kurt Carr and the singers' debut major label and album Together was released in 1991. Transitions in the label lead to GospoCentric Records which was owned and co-founded by to Vicki Mack Lataillade.

1994-2002: New Label, Growing Success
Now signed onto GospoCentric, the group released their first album on the label titled Serious About It! The album  featured renditions of many recorded songs, such as a rendention of Salt-N-Pepa's Whatta Man. The album made it to the charts in 1995. In July 1996, the singers recorded their second album on the label No One Else at the West Angeles which was released in March 1997. The album also features Anastacia, Mary Mary, & Andrea McClurkin-Mellini (sister of Donnie McClurkin) serving as a few of the additional background singers.. The album most notably featured For Every Mountain which became one of the Carr's most well known songs later on. In 2000, Awesome Wonder was released, which featured more popular songs with In the Sanctuary being the most notable. In the Sanctuary became his most popular song, leading to internet memes among other ways to highlight the success of the song. The album stayed in the charts longer than the previous albums and it increased the group's success higher.

2002-2012: One Church Project, Just the Beginning, and Bless this House
While In the Sanctuary became more popular, Carr continued to write songs for other gospel artists throughout the new decade and millenium such as Byron Cage, Tramaine Hawkins, and Bishop Paul S. Morton. In 2005, Kurt Carr released the One Church Project in 2005 which featured God Blocked It and God Great God, among others. The theme of the album was about being a multicultural church. In 2008, Kurt Carr released his first two disc album Just the Beginning which was released on his self titled label Kurt Carr Gospel and Zomba.

2012-present: Bless this House and Bless Somebody Else
In 2013, Kurt Carr released Bless this House on Verity Gospel Music Group which included the single I've Seen Him Do It, We've Gotta Put Jesus Back, & Great God Great Praise.
After a six-year hiatus, Kurt Carr released Bless Somebody Else on RCA Records' Gospel Label RCA Inspiration in 2019 in which Kurt Carr Gospel Label from Just the Beginning returned. The single was released the same year as long with the single  Blessing After Blessing which is a ballad a year later.

Carr's music is a blend of traditional gospel composition and vocals, with elements of R&B, jazz, soul, blues, and the distinct modern harmonies and singing styles found in urban contemporary gospel. The Kurt Carr Singers under his direction and musical influence have created seven albums. Kurt Carr has won four Stellar Awards.

Discography

Albums

Compilation albums

Singles

References

Kurt Carr – Interview (March 2005) on BlackGospel.com
Kurt Carr – Interview (November 2008) on BlackGospel.com

1964 births
20th-century African-American male singers
American gospel singers
American Pentecostals
Living people
21st-century African-American male singers
Members of the Church of God in Christ
Urban contemporary gospel musicians